Fritillaria pontica, the Pontic fritillary, is a species of flowering plant in the genus Fritillaria native to the mountains of the Balkans, the Aegean Islands and Anatolia. Shade tolerant and easy to grow, it has gained the Royal Horticultural Society's Award of Garden Merit.

References

pontica
Plants described in 1826